Thor: The Mighty Avenger is a toy line manufactured by Hasbro based on the Marvel Studios film, Thor. It is composed mainly of 3.75" scale action figures.

The line falls under Marvel's "Avengers Assemble" marketing banner, which included the Iron Man: The Armored Avenger and Captain America: The First Avenger toy lines. This was used as a lead up to 2012's The Avengers film.

Unlike previous 3.75" action figure lines based on movies, Hasbro did not do a comic series with this line. All of the figures were based on the movie.

Action Figures - 3.75" Single Carded

Wave 1 - March 2011

Wave 2 - May 2011

Wave 3 - May 2011

Wave 4 - June 2011

Action Figures - 3.75" Deluxe Series

Wave 1 - March 2011

Wave 2 - March 2011

Wave 3 - Cancelled 
This wave was never released.

Action Figures - 6" Legends Series

Wave 1 - October 2011

Action Figures - 8" Hero Series

Wave 1 - March 2011

Wave 2 - March 2011

Action Figures - 10" Large Scale

Role Play
Role play toys are products such as masks, gloves, and life-size accessories.

Marvel Super Hero Squad 3-Packs

Wave 1 - March 2011

External links 
Free Thor iOS Checklist Application

Thor (Marvel Comics)
2010s toys